The Contrarian Prize is an annual prize which has been awarded either annually or bi-annually since its establishment in 2012. The prize promotes the contribution of non-conformist thinking to the British public debate by recognising individuals who have demonstrated independence, courage, and sacrifice through the ideas they have introduced, or stands they have taken.

Nominations for the prize are submitted through an online form by the public each year, with the shortlist and winner selected by a panel of judges. The judging panel is chaired by Ali Miraj, who founded the prize, with other judges including economist Vicky Pryce, businessman and winner of the inaugural prize Michael Woodford, journalist Izabella Kaminska, and politician Gawain Towler.

The prize: "The Three Politicians" 
"The Three Politicians" was originally created in 2007 by Italian pop art sculptor, Maruro Perucchetti, and donated by him in recognition of the inaugural prize awarded in March 2013.

The pigmented urethane resin sculpture illustrates the "three politicians" in the form of the three wise monkeys – one who does not see, one who does not speak, and one who does not hear.

List of shortlisted candidates and prize winners

2013 Contrarian Prize 
The shortlist for the inaugural prize was announced in February 2013, and the prize was presented by Isabel Oakeshott on 18 March 2013.
 Michael Woodford – winner
 Giles Fraser
 Nigel Farage
 Heather Brooke
 Peter Tatchell

2014 Contrarian Prize 
The 2014 prize was awarded on 2 April 2014.
 Clive Stafford Smith – winner
 Benjamin Zephaniah
 Brian Cathcart
 Douglas Carswell
 Kay Sheldon
 Peter Oborne

Presented by: Will Hutton

2015 Contrarian Prize 
The shortlist for the 2015 prize was announced in June 2015, and the prize was presented by Jonathan Dimbleby on 18 June 2015.
 Simon Danczuk – winner
 Craig Murray
 Ed Husain
 George Galloway
 Nevres Kemal

2017 Contrarian Prize 
The 2017 prize was presented by Sir Simon Jenkins on 16 May 2017.
 Patrick Minford – winner
 Gisela Stuart
 Narindar Saroop
 Faith Spear
 Nigel Farage

2019 Contrarian Prize 
The shortlist for the 2019 prize was announced in June 2019, and the prize was presented by Jeremy Paxman on 25 June 2019.
 Katharine Birbalsingh – winner
 Theresa May
 Douglas Murray
 David Goodhart
 Helen Pluckrose

The Contrarian Prize Lecture 
Following the prize-giving ceremony, an event is held in conjunction with Cass Business School typically in the form of a lecture or discussion featuring the winner of that year's prize.

See also 

 The Business School (formerly Cass)
 Ali Miraj

External links 
 The Contrarian Prize - official website

References 

British awards
British lecture series
Economics awards
Politics awards